Caitlyn Nevins (born 1 June 1987), also known as Caitlyn Strachan, is a former Australia netball international. Between 2014 and 2016, she was a member of three successive ANZ Championship winning teams. She won her first title with the 2014 Melbourne Vixens before winning the 2015 and 2016 titles with Queensland Firebirds. She was a member of the Victorian Fury teams that won Australian Netball League titles in 2009, 2013 and 2014.

Early life, family and education
Strachan is the daughter of Lyn and Rob Strachan. She is originally from Victoria, born in Geelong and raised in Echuca. Between 1999 and 2004 she attended Echuca High School and between 2005 and 2008 she attended La Trobe University where she gained a Bachelor of Podiatry. Throughout her netball career, Strachan continued to work as a podiatrist. In November 2014, Strachan married Sam Nevins, an osteopath.

Playing career

Early career
In her youth, Strachan played both basketball and netball. She played basketball with  Echuca Pirates and netball with the Echuca and District Netball Association and Echuca United Football Netball Club. She trialed for state teams in both netball and basketball. At 17 she decided to focus solely on netball.

Victorian Netball League
Between 2006 and 2014, Strachan played for both Southern Saints and Yarra Valley Grammar Ariels in the Victorian Netball League, winning club best and fairest awards with both teams. After six seasons with Saints, in 2012 Strachan switched to Ariels. In 2012 she shared the league's MVP award, the Margaret Caldow Trophy, with Helen Barclay and Mwai Kumwenda. In 2013 she again shared the award, this time with Brooke Thompson.

Australian Netball League
Victorian Fury
Strachan had two spells playing for Victorian Fury in the Australian Netball League. She initially played for Fury during the 2009 season. She again played for Fury between 2012 and 2014. She was a member of the Fury teams that won ANL titles in 2009, 2013 and 2014. She was vice captain of the 2013 and 2014 teams.

Canberra Darters
During the 2011 season, Strachan played for Canberra Darters in the Australian Netball League. She played in 31 of 32 quarters for Darters. She was named the team's best and fairest player for the season and was subsequently inducted into the Netball ACT Hall of Fame.

Melbourne Vixens
Strachan was a member of the Melbourne Vixens team that won the 2014 ANZ Championship. However she sat on the bench for most of the season, kept out of the starting seven by the form of Madi Robinson.

Queensland Firebirds
Between 2015 and 2019, Strachan, now known as Caitlyn Nevins, played for Queensland Firebirds, initially in the ANZ Championship and later in Suncorp Super Netball. She was a prominent member of the Firebirds teams that won the 2015 and 2016 ANZ Championships. In 2017 she was appointed Firebirds vice-captain. In August 2019, Nevins announced her retirement from netball, effective at the end of the season.

Australia
After representing Australia at the 2016 Fast5 Netball World Series, Nevins made her senior debut during the first 2017 Netball Quad Series. On 28 January 2017 in the opening match against New Zealand, Nevins replaced Paige Hadley for the final quarter, helping Australia secure a 57–50 win. At 29, she became the oldest debutante for Australia in forty two years. On 31 January 2017, she made her first start for Australia in a 62–46 win against 
South Africa.

Honours

Australia
Netball Quad Series
Winners: 2017 (January/February)
Fast5 Netball World Series
Runners Up: 2016
Queensland Firebirds
ANZ Championship
Winners: 2015, 2016
Melbourne Vixens
ANZ Championship
Winners: 2014
Victorian Fury
Australian Netball League
Winners: 2009, 2013, 2014
Individual Awards

References

1987 births
Living people
Australian netball players
Australia international netball players
Australia international Fast5 players
Netball players from Victoria (Australia)
Victorian Fury players
Canberra Darters (ANL) players
Melbourne Vixens players
Queensland Firebirds players
Victorian Netball League players
Australian Netball League players
ANZ Championship players
Suncorp Super Netball players
La Trobe University alumni
Australian podiatrists
People from Echuca